Alun Robert Bollinger  (born 1948) is a New Zealand cinematographer, who has worked on several Peter Jackson films, and many other films in New Zealand. He has also been a Director of Photography, including the second unit for Peter Jackson's trilogy The Lord of the Rings. He started as a trainee cine-camera operator for television with the New Zealand Broadcasting Corporation in 1966.

In the 2005 Queen's Birthday Honours, Bollinger was appointed a Member of the New Zealand Order of Merit, for services to cinematography.

A documentary released in 2008, Barefoot Cinema: The Art and Life of Cinematographer Alun Bollinger, turns the camera 180 degrees and looks at Bollinger's  work and life.

He lives at Blacks Point, near Reefton on the West Coast of New Zealand, with his wife Helen.

Selected filmography
Cinematographer
1977: Wild Man
1977: Dagg Day Afternoon
1978: Charlie Horse 
1980: Beyond Reasonable Doubt 
1981: Goodbye Pork Pie 
1983: Patu! 
1984: Vigil
1985: Came a Hot Friday 
1986: For Love Alone (Australia) 
1994: Heavenly Creatures
1995: Forgotten Silver
1995: Cinema of Unease 
1996: The Frighteners
2003: Perfect Strangers
2004: Oyster Farmer (Australia) 
2005: River Queen
2007: Lovely Rita
2010: Matariki
2017: The Stolen

References

The New Zealand Listener, 13 May 2006 (pages 38–40)
North and South (New Zealand), March 2007 (pages 74–81)

External links
 Alun's profile and screenography on NZ On Screen
 
 Alun Bollinger - Biography at Arts Foundation of New Zealand
 Awards for Cinematography
New Zealand Listener interview

1948 births
Living people
New Zealand cinematographers
Members of the New Zealand Order of Merit